Dungourney is a village in County Cork, Ireland on the R627 regional road  northeast of Midleton. The river Dungourney flows through the village. St. Peter's National School is located in the centre.  There is a church in the west of the village and a post office across the road. There are several roads linking to Midleton, Castlematyr and Tallow.

Sport
Dungourney GAA Club and Dungourney Camogie Club are the local Gaelic games clubs. 

The Fitzgibbon Cup, the hurling competition contested by university teams, is named after Dungourney man Fr. Edwin Fitzgibbon. He was born in 1884, and went to school in the area before joining the Capuchin Franciscan Order in 1893. He died in 1938 and was buried at the Capuchin cemetery in Rochestown.

See also
List of towns and villages in Ireland

References

Towns and villages in County Cork
Civil parishes of County Cork